Sacconemertes is a genus of ribbon worms belonging to the family Tetrastemmatidae.

Species:
 Sacconemertes arenosa Karling, 1933

References

Tetrastemmatidae
Nemertea genera